Tweedle may refer to:

Scientific slang for a preon in particle physics.
Tweedles (album), by The Residents 2006
Elizabeth Tweedle (born 1985), retired British artistic gymnast
Stanley H. Tweedle, major character in sci-fi TV series Lexx

See also
Tweedledum and Tweedledee
Tweedle Dee, Tweedle Dum (disambiguation)
Tweedle Dee (disambiguation)